Asadulla Lachinau, aka Asabdullah Lachinov (born April 17, 1986 in Dagestan, Russia) is a Russian-Belarusian freestyle wrestler. He competed in the men's freestyle 57 kg event at the 2016 Summer Olympics, in which he was eliminated in the repechage by Yang Kyong-il.

References

External links
 

1986 births
Living people
Belarusian male sport wrestlers
Olympic wrestlers of Belarus
Wrestlers at the 2016 Summer Olympics